Ali Shazleem is a Maldivian film actor, director and producer.

Career
Shazleem made his film debut in the Aishath Fuad Thaufeeq-directed Hulhudhaan (2014) alongside Mariyam Majudha, which was a critical success. The film was later screened at the Venice Film Festival. Though Hulhudhaan was released earlier, Shazleem's first project was Maldivian first anthology film Hatharu Halha which got delayed till 2019.

In 2015, Shazleem appeared in the Ali Shifau-directed romantic film Emme Fahu Vindha Jehendhen as a company fraud, alongside Mohamed Jumayyil and Mariyam Majudha. The film which, narrates the struggle and challenges a happily married couple undergo, was the highest grossing Maldivian film of the year, and was a critical success. The following year he starred in another Dark Rain Entertainment production, the Ali Shifau-directed romantic comedy Vaashey Mashaa Ekee (2016) opposite Mohamed Jumayyil and Mariyam Majudha narrating the life of a happily married couple being separated due to the husband's crippling fear of commitment on his wife's pregnancy.

In 2017, Rizwee featured in the Ali Shifau-directed romantic comedy Mee Loaybakee alongside Mohamed Jumayyil and Mariyam Azza. The film, which is considered to include the largest cast in a Maldivian feature film, narrates the story of two ex-lovers sliding into the friend zone with the envy and diffidence they experience amidst a convoluted love-triangle. The film and his performance received mainly positive reviews from critics where Aishath Maaha of Avas called his acting to be "good overall". The film emerged as one of the highest grossing Maldivian films of 2017.

2018 was a dull year for the Maldivian film-industry with regards to 2018 Maldivian presidential election, hence only one film of Shazleem was released during the year; a suspense thriller film Dhevansoora (2018) written and directed by Yoosuf Shafeeu. The film marks Shafeeu's thirtieth direction and features an ensemble cast of twenty-one actors. Revolving around a murder investigation, he played a police officer and the investigation head trying to solve the murder mystery. The film received positive reviews from critics and was considered a "norm-breaker" for the Maldivian cinema. Ahmed Hameed Adam, reviewing from VNews, applauded Shazleem's versatility since he was believed to be "stereotyped" as a comedian. Ismail Nail Rasheed from Raajje.mv wrote: "Though remembered for his comic roles, Shazleem is surprisingly good in the serious role of a policeman". He next starred in a recurring role in the first Maldivian web-series, a romantic drama by Fathimath Nahula, Huvaa which began streaming in November 2018. The series, streamed through the digital platform Baiskoafu, centers around a happy and radiant family which breaks into despairing pieces after a tragic incident that led to an unaccountable loss. The series and his performance as a fraud being arrested for murder, were positively received.

Later during the year, the first Maldivian anthology film was released which featured him in the segment directed by Ali Shifau, titled Foshi. The project was shot in 2013 and digitally released six years later due to several delays in post-production.

Filmography

Feature film

Television

Other work

References 

Living people
People from Malé
21st-century Maldivian male actors
Maldivian male film actors
Year of birth missing (living people)